Paul C. Aebersold (1910-1967) was an American nuclear physicist and pioneer of the biologic and medical application of radioactive materials. He worked on the Manhattan Project and became the first director of the United States Atomic Energy Commission's Division of Isotope Development.

Education 
Aebersold was born in Fresno, California and earned a Bachelor's degree in Physics from Stanford University in 1932 and his PhD in physics at the University of California, Berkeley in 1939.

Career 
In the 1930s, Aebersold participated in the first production and application of radioactive materials administered to humans (sodium and phosphorus).

While working as an assistant to Ernest Lawrence, he administered the growth of the Radiation Laboratory at the University of California, Berkeley. He later worked at Oak Ridge and Los Alamos. Aebersold took measurements and conducted radiation-related research prior to and after the Trinity nuclear weapons test. After World War II, Aebersold returned to Oak Ridge where he rose to the position of Director of the Division of Isotopes Development.

In the 1960s, Aebersold's health began to decline, and he was hospitalised for a year and a half prior to his retirement. He committed suicide on 29 May 1967 by throwing himself from a 17-story building.

Legacy 
An award issued by the Society of Nuclear Medicine and Molecular Imaging was named in his memory. It was first presented in 1973  for "Outstanding Achievement in Basic Nuclear Medicine Science".

References 

Manhattan Project people
1910 births
1967 deaths
1967 suicides
Suicides by jumping in the United States
 People from Fresno, California
 Stanford University alumni
 University of California, Berkeley alumni